Adiantopsis is a genus of ferns in the subfamily Cheilanthoideae of the family Pteridaceae.

Species
, the Checklist of Ferns and Lycophytes of the World recognized the following species and hybrids:

Adiantopsis alata Prantl
Adiantopsis asplenioides Maxon
Adiantopsis aurea Link-Pérez, Seabolt & Ledford
Adiantopsis × australopedata Hickey, M.S.Barker & Ponce
Adiantopsis cheilanthoides R.M.Senna
Adiantopsis chlorophylla (Sw.) Fée
Adiantopsis crinoidea Link-Pérez & Hickey
Adiantopsis dactylifera Link-Pérez & Hickey
Adiantopsis dichotoma (Cav.) Moore
Adiantopsis flexuosa (Kunze) Link-Pérez & Hickey
Adiantopsis hickeyi Link-Pérez, Seabolt & Ledford
Adiantopsis lindigii (Mett.) Prantl
Adiantopsis luetzelburgii Rosenst.
Adiantopsis monticola (Gardner) Moore
Adiantopsis occulta Sehnem
Adiantopsis orbignyana (Mett. ex Kuhn) Ponce & Scataglini
Adiantopsis parvisegmenta M.S.Barker & Hickey
Adiantopsis paupercula (Kunze) Fée
Adiantopsis pedata (Hook.) Moore
Adiantopsis pentagona M.S.Barker & Hickey
Adiantopsis perfasciculata Sehnem
Adiantopsis propinqua (Mett.) Prantl
Adiantopsis radiata (L.) Fée
Adiantopsis recurvata (Baker) Ponce & Scataglini
Adiantopsis reesii (Jenman) C.Chr.
Adiantopsis regularis (Mett.) T.Moore
Adiantopsis rupicola Maxon
Adiantopsis scalariformis Link-Pérez, Seabolt & Ledford
Adiantopsis seemannii (Hook.) Maxon
Adiantopsis senae (Baker) Schuettp. & A.Davila
Adiantopsis ternata Prantl
Adiantopsis timida Link-Pérez & Hickey
Adiantopsis trifurcata (Baker) Link-Pérez & Hickey
Adiantopsis tweedieana (Hook.) Link-Pérez & Hickey
Adiantopsis vincentii M.S.Barker & Hickey

References

Pteridaceae
Fern genera
Taxa named by Antoine Laurent Apollinaire Fée